Dubberman Denmark is a Danish dubbing company based in Copenhagen, Denmark. It is a subsidiary of Dubberman.

Clients
 Cartoon Network (Denmark)
 Disney Character Voices International
 Danmarks Radio
 TV 2 (Denmark)

References

External links 
 Official website

Mass media companies of Denmark
Mass media companies based in Copenhagen
Companies based in Copenhagen Municipality
Dubbing studios